The Bros is a 2017 South Korean comedy-drama film directed by Chang You-jeong. The film stars Ma Dong-seok, Lee Dong-hwi and Lee Hanee.

Plot
Seok-bong is a penniless history teacher who dreams of discovering lost treasure. His younger brother Joo-bong is an ambitious junior executive at a construction firm. They meet on their way to their father's funeral in their hometown of Andong, neither of them having seen him or one another since a disastrous scene at the funeral of their mother. En route, the brothers hit a woman with their car, after which she suffers amnesia. In their very traditional family, the brothers, especially Seok-bong as the eldest, are expected to perform many ceremonial duties as part of the funeral rites. However, Seok-bong is mostly interested in searching for relics or buried treasure that could help him repay a debt, while Joo-bong risks losing his job if he cannot obtain permission to build a highway construction project for his company through the family's land.  As the multi-day funeral elapses, the brothers learn more about their family, one another, and themselves.

Cast

Main
Ma Dong-seok as Lee Seok-bong
Kwon Min-joon as young Seok-bong 
Lee Dong-hwi as Lee Joo-bong
Kwon Min-jae as young Joo-bong
Lee Hanee as Oh Ro-Ra

Supporting

Jo Woo-jin as Lee Mi-bong 
Song Young-chang as Dang-sook
Song Sang-eun as Mi-bong's wife
Jung Jae-jin as Grandfather's cousin
Lee Ji-ha as Dang-sook's mother
Lee Bong-ryun as Cousin's wife
Heo Sung-tae as Monk / Hyeong-bae
Chae Dong-hyun as Beop-jeong
Jeong Soon-won as Team leader Go
Song Won-soo as Elder Lee Seong-deok
Kim Ji-han as Elder Lee Man-deok
Park Jong-gook as Elder Lee Soon-deok / Confucian scholar 1
Kim Jong-ho as Elder Lee Beom-goo
Kang Hee-joong as Elder Lee Wan-go
Sin Sin-Beom as Elder Lee Gwi-yal
Son Young-soon as Enraged grandmother
Yoon Tae-hee as Young grandmother 
Park Jung-pyo as Mr. Park
Ahn Se-ho as Mr. Ahn 
Han Kuk-jin as Mr. Shin

Cameo appearance
Ji Chang-wook as Young Choon-bae
Oh Man-seok as Representative Oh
Kim Kang-hyun as Han-ji 
Seo Hyun-chul as Eldest grandson
Choi Ji-ho as Dispatch police

Special appearance
Jeon Moo-song as Choon-bae
Sung Byoung-sook as Soon-rye 
Seo Yea-ji as Sa-ra

Production 
Principal photography began on January 6, 2017, and wrapped on March 5, 2017.

Release and reception 
The film was released in the local cinemas on November 2, 2017.

During the opening weekend the film sold 605,690 tickets at the box office, trailing behind Thor: Ragnarok which was released at the same time in Korean cinemas. By the ninth day since the film was released, The Bros surpassed 1 million viewers.

References

External links
 

2017 films
2017 comedy-drama films
South Korean comedy-drama films
2010s South Korean films